Rebecca of Sunnybrook Farm is a 1932 film based on the 1903 children's classic novel by Kate Douglas Wiggin.

It was filmed by Fox Film Corporation and directed by Alfred Santell. The film starred Marian Nixon as Rebecca and co-starred Ralph Bellamy.

Premise
A young girl from Sunnybrook goes to live with her wealthy relatives and falls in love with a doctor.

Cast
 Marian Nixon as Rebecca
 Ralph Bellamy as Dr. Ladd
 Mae Marsh as Aunt Jane
 Louise Closser Hale as Aunt Miranda
 Alan Hale as Mr. Simpson
 Sarah Padden as Mrs. Cobb
 Alphonse Ethier as Mr. Cobb
 Eula Guy as Mrs. Simpson
 Ronald Harris as Jack o' Lantern
 Willis Marks as Jacob

Other adaptations
Rebecca of Sunnybrook Farm, 1909 play 
Rebecca of Sunnybrook Farm, 1917 film
Rebecca of Sunnybrook Farm, 1938 film starring Shirley Temple

References

External links
 
 
 
 

1932 films
1930s English-language films
Films based on children's books
American black-and-white films
Films directed by Alfred Santell
Films with screenplays by Sonya Levien
American children's films
Films based on works by Kate Douglas Wiggin
Films scored by Hugo Friedhofer
Films scored by Arthur Lange
Fox Film films
American drama films
1932 drama films
1930s American films